Christopher Michael Dishman (born February 27, 1974 in Gothenburg, Nebraska) is a former American Football offensive lineman. Dishman grew up in Cozad, Nebraska, where he played on the 1991 Class B state champion team. He was also a class B state wrestling runner up. Dishman played college football for the Nebraska Cornhuskers. After college he played eight seasons in the NFL, including 7 for the Arizona Cardinals and 1 for the St. Louis Rams.

References 

1974 births
Living people
American football offensive guards
American football centers
Nebraska Cornhuskers football players
St. Louis Rams players
Arizona Cardinals players
People from Cozad, Nebraska
People from Gothenburg, Nebraska